Early participants in the Latter Day Saint movement consist of those individuals who were involved in Joseph Smith's Latter Day Saint movement prior to Smith's departure for Ohio in January 1831.  Early participants also included the Three Witnesses and the Eight Witnesses to the Book of Mormon and members of the extended Whitmer and Smith families. Other early members included friends and acquaintances of the Smith and Whitmer families, such as Orrin Porter Rockwell.

Official first members
According to what is now known as the Church of Jesus Christ of Latter-day Saints (LDS Church), the first six members of the church were:

 Joseph Smith
 Oliver Cowdery
 Hyrum Smith
 Peter Whitmer, Jr.
 Samuel H. Smith
 David Whitmer

Early participants
Early membership also included the remainder of the Smith family of Manchester: Joseph Smith, Sr., Lucy Mack Smith, Calvin Stoddard and wife Sophronia Smith Stoddard, William Smith, Katharine Smith, Don Carlos Smith, and Lucy Smith.

John Whitmer was baptized into the movement as early as June 1829, nearly a year prior to the formal organization of the Church. The Whitmer family and their spouses who were early members included: Hiram Page and his wife Catherine Whitmer Page, Jacob Whitmer and his wife Elizabeth Schott Whitmer, Christian Whitmer and his wife Anne Schott Whitmer, Elizabeth Ann Whitmer, Peter Whitmer, Sr. and his wife Mary Musselman Whitmer.

Early members from the Rockwell family include Sarah Witt Rockwell and her children Orrin Porter Rockwell, Caroline, Electa and Peter. Members from the Jolly family included Elizabeth, Vincent, William, Harriet, John and Julia Ann Jolly.

Solomon Chamberlain wrote in his 1858 autobiography that he was baptized shortly after the organization of the church.

Ziba Peterson was baptized on April 18. Ezra Thayre was baptized on October 10, 1830.

Preserved Harris, Martin Harris's brother.

Milestones
The Latter Day Saint movement experienced major milestones at its organizations, its conference, and its relocation to Ohio.

Organization of April 6, 1830
On April 6, 1830, Joseph Smith Jr., Oliver Cowdery, and a group of approximately 50 believers met to formally organize the Church of Christ into a legal institution.

First conference of June 9, 1830
The new church's first conference was held on June 9, 1830, in Fayette, N.Y., with 27 members.

Departure to Kirtland
In January 1831, Joseph Smith traveled to Kirtland, Ohio.

Table of baptisms
According to one scholar, the first known baptisms include:

References

Church of Christ (Latter Day Saints)
History of the Latter Day Saint movement
Lists of Latter Day Saints